The 1950 Xavier Gold Rush football team was an American football team that represented Xavier University of Louisiana in the Southern Intercollegiate Athletic Conference during the 1950 college football season. Under head coach Alfred "Zack" Priestley, the team compiled a 7–1 record (6–0 against conference opponents), shut out five of eight opponents, and outscored all opponents by a total of 242 to 54 and was ranked No. 13 among the nation's black college football teams according to the Pittsburgh Courier and its Dickinson Rating System. The team was undefeated in the regular season, and its sole loss was to No. 2 Southern in the Pelican State Classic. The team was led on offense by quarterback Eddie Flint, fullback Rip Robert, and Willie McKee.

Schedule

References

Xavier
Xavier Gold Rush football seasons
Xavier Gold Rush football